High Lane or Highlane may refer to:

 High Lane (film)
 High Lane, Greater Manchester, England
 High Lane railway station
 Highlane, Cheshire, a location in England
 Highlane, Derbyshire, England
 Highlanes, Cornwall, England